Ri Vari (also Romanized as Rī Varī; also known as Rūbarī) is a village in Uraman Takht Rural District, Uraman District, Sarvabad County, Kurdistan Province, Iran. At the 2006 census, its population was 412, in 95 families. The village is populated by Kurds.

References 

Towns and villages in Sarvabad County
Kurdish settlements in Kurdistan Province